Gymnopilus perisporius is a species of mushroom in the family Hymenogastraceae.

See also

List of Gymnopilus species

External links
Gymnopilus perisporius at Index Fungorum

perisporius
Fungi of North America